is a city located in northern Mie Prefecture, Japan. , the city had an estimated population of 49,457 in 21,745 households and a population density of 260 persons per km².

Geography
Kameyama is located in the north-central part of Mie Prefecture. The Suzuka Mountains are in the northwestern part of the city, and the Nunobiki Mountains are in the southwestern part. More than half of the city's area is forest.

Neighboring municipalities
Mie Prefecture
Tsu
Suzuka
Iga
Shiga Prefecture
Kōka

Climate
Kameyama has a Humid subtropical climate (Köppen Cfa) characterized by warm summers and cool winters with light to no snowfall.

Demographics
Per Japanese census data, the population of Kameyama has increased slowly over the past 50 years.

History
Kameyama developed as the castle town of Kameyama Castle, which belonged to the Ise-Kameyama Domain under the Tokugawa shogunate. In the early 17th century, the castle town was Kameyama-juku, the forty-sixth post station of Tōkaidō. Seki-juku and Sakashita-juku on the Tōkaidō, also fall within its borders.
During the establishment of the modern municipalities system in the early Meiji period, Kamayama-juku was organized into the town of Kameyama within Suzuka District. It was elevated to city status on October 1, 1954.

On January 11, 2005, the town of Seki (also from Suzuka District) was merged into Kameyama.

Government
Kameyama has a mayor-council form of government with a directly elected mayor and a unicameral city council of 18 members. Kameyama contributes one member to the Mie Prefectural Assembly. In terms of national politics, the city is part of Mie 2nd district of the lower house of the Diet of Japan.

Economy
Candles are a traditional product of the city. Sharp Corporation has been operating one of the world's largest LCD factories in the city since January 8, 2004.

Education
Kameyama has eleven public elementary schools and three public middle schools operated by the city government and one public high school operated by the Mie Prefectural Department of Education. There is also one private high school.

Transportation

Railway
 JR Tōkai – Kansai Main Line
 -  
 JR Tōkai – Kisei Main Line
 -  
 JR West – Kansai Main Line
 -   -

Highway
 Higashi-Meihan Expressway
 Ise Expressway
 Shin-Meishin Expressway

Local attractions 
Kameyama Castle
Seki-juku

International relations

Twin towns — Sister cities
Kameyama is twinned with:
  Gose, Nara, Japan (1998)  
  Habikino, Osaka, Japan (1998)

Notable people

Shiro Hattori - linguist
Teinosuke Kinugasa - film director
Kiyoshi Toyoda - baseball player

References

External links

Kameyama City official website 

Cities in Mie Prefecture
Kameyama, Mie